FedEx Express is a major American cargo airline based in Memphis, Tennessee, United States. As of 2020, it is one of the world's largest airlines in terms of fleet size and freight tons flown. It is the namesake and leading subsidiary of FedEx Corporation, delivering freight and packages to more than 375 destinations over 220 countries across six continents each day. FedEx Express is also the world's largest express transportation company.

Its headquarters are in Memphis with its global "SuperHub" located at Memphis International Airport. In the United States, FedEx Express has a national hub at Indianapolis International Airport. Regional hubs are located at Ted Stevens Anchorage International Airport, Fort Worth Alliance Airport, Piedmont Triad International Airport, Miami International Airport, Newark Liberty International Airport, Oakland International Airport and Ontario International Airport. International regional hubs are located at Cologne Bonn Airport, Dubai International Airport, Guangzhou Baiyun International Airport, Liège Airport, Milan Malpensa Airport, Kansai International Airport, Charles de Gaulle Airport, Incheon International Airport, Shanghai Pudong International Airport, Singapore Changi Airport and Toronto Pearson International Airport. There are a total of 13 air hubs in the company's worldwide network.  The company slogan is "The World On Time".

History

Early history

The concept for what became Federal Express came to Fred Smith in the mid-1960s, while an undergraduate student  For an economics class, he submitted a paper which argued that in modern technological society time meant money more than ever before and with the advent of miniaturized electronic circuitry, very small components had become extremely valuable. He argued that the consumer society was becoming increasingly hungry for mass-produced electronic items, but the decentralizing effect induced by these very devices gave manufacturers tremendous logistic problems in delivering the items. Smith felt that the necessary delivery speed could only be achieved by using air transport. But he believed that the U.S. air cargo system was so inflexible and bound by regulations at that time that it was completely incapable of making sufficiently fast deliveries. Plus, the U.S. air cargo industry was highly unsuited to the role. Its system depended on cooperation between companies, as interlining was often necessary to get a consignment from point A to point B, and the industry relied heavily on cargo forwarders to fill hold space and perform doorstep deliveries.

In his paper, Smith proposed a new concept—have one carrier be responsible for a piece of cargo from local pick-up right through to ultimate delivery, operating its own aircraft, depots, posting stations, and delivery vans. To ensure accurate sorting and dispatching of every item of freight, the carrier would fly it from all of its pickup stations to a central clearinghouse, from where the entire operation would be controlled. For years it has been misreported that the professor teaching the course gave the paper the grade of "C", but Fred clarified in a 2004 interview that the grade is not known and the reports of a "C" grade were due to his response to a reporter who asked him what grade he received and his reply was, "I don't know, probably made my usual C." Despite the professor's opinion, Smith held on to the idea.

Smith founded Federal Express Corporation in 1971 with $4 million from his inheritance and $91 million in venture capital. in Little Rock, Arkansas, where Smith was operating Little Rock Airmotive. After a lack of support from Little Rock National Airport, Smith moved the company to Memphis, Tennessee and Memphis International Airport in 1973.

The company started overnight operations on April 17, 1973, with fourteen Dassault Falcon 20s that connected twenty-five cities in the United States. Fred Smith's childhood friend, John Fry of Ardent Studios, sent Ardent partner Terry Manning to the Federal Express home office on Democrat Road near the Memphis Airport with the first package to be put into the system. That night, 186 packages were carried. Services included both overnight and two-day package and envelope delivery services, as well as Courier Pak. Federal Express began to market itself as "the freight service company with 550-mile-per-hour delivery trucks". However, the company began to experience financial difficulties, losing up to a million USD a month. While waiting for a flight home to Memphis from Chicago after being turned down for capital by General Dynamics, Smith impulsively hopped a flight to Las Vegas, where he won $27,000 playing blackjack. The winnings enabled the cash-strapped company to meet payroll the following Monday. "The $27,000 wasn't decisive, but it was an omen that things would get better", Smith says. In the end, he raised somewhere between $50 and $70 million, from twenty of the US's leading risk venture speculators, including such companies as the First National City Bank of New York and the Bank of America in California. At the time, Federal Express was the most highly financed new company in U.S. history, in terms of venture capital.

Federal Express installed its first drop box in 1975 which allowed customers to drop off packages without going to a company local branch. In 1976, the company became profitable with an average volume of 19,000 parcels per day.

Rapid growth

A 1977 legislative change (Public Law 95–163) removed restrictions on the routes operated by all-cargo airlines, and enabled Federal Express to purchase its first large aircraft: seven Boeing 727-100s. In 1978, the company went public and was listed on The New York Stock Exchange. The following year, it became the first shipping company to use a computer to manage packages when it launched "COSMOS" (Customers, Operations and Services Master Online System), a centralized computer system to manage people, packages, vehicles, and weather scenarios in real time. In 1980, the company implemented "DADS" (Digitally Assisted Dispatch System) to coordinate on-call pickups for customers; this system allows customers to schedule pickups for the same day.

In 1980, Federal Express began service to a further 90 cities in the United States. The following year, the company introduced its overnight letter to compete with the U.S. Postal Service's Express Mail, and allowed document shipping for the first time. Later in 1981, it started international operations with service to Canada, and officially opened its "SuperHub" at the Memphis International Airport.

Federal Express' sales topped $1 billion for the first time in 1983. In the same year the company introduced ZapMail, a fax service that guaranteed the delivery of up to five pages in less than two hours for $35. ZapMail would later become a huge failure for the company, costing it hundreds of millions of dollars.

In the 1970s, with the enormous growth, FedEx needed a method for quality control. They developed the tracking number for internal use to find that packages were moving properly. This info was eventually applied to all packages and be made available to the public to find the status of one's own package. In 1986, the company introduced the "SuperTracker", a hand-held bar code scanner which brought parcel tracking to the shipping industry for the first time. Federal Express continued its rapid expansion in the late 1980s, and opened its hub at Newark Liberty International Airport in 1986 and at Indianapolis International Airport and Oakland International Airport in 1988. In 1989, the company acquired Flying Tiger Line to expand its international service, and subsequently opened a hub at Ted Stevens Anchorage International Airport to accommodate this new, expanded service. As the volume of international shipments increased, Federal Express created Clear Electronic Customs Clearance System to expedite regulatory clearance while cargo is en route.

FedEx era

In 1994, Federal Express rebranded itself as "FedEx" for marketing purposes, officially adopting a nickname that had been used for years. Also that year, FedEx launched  as the first transportation web site to offer online package tracking, which allowed customers to conduct business via Internet. In 1995, the company acquired air routes from Evergreen International to start services to China, and opened an Asia and Pacific hub in Subic Bay International Airport in the Philippines. In 1997, FedEx opened its hub at Fort Worth Alliance Airport and, in 1999, opened a European hub at Charles de Gaulle Airport in France.

In the 1990s, FedEx planned, but later abandoned, a joint service with British Airways to have BA fly a Concorde supersonic jet airliner to Shannon Airport in Ireland with FedEx packages on board, and then FedEx would have flown the packages subsonically to their delivery points in Europe. Ron Ponder, a vice president at the time, was in charge of this proposed venture.

In 1998, FedEx merged with Caliber System and reorganized as a holding company, FDX Corporation. In 2000, FDX changed its name to FedEx Corporation and standardized the names of its subsidiaries around the "FedEx" brand. The original "Federal Express" cargo airline changed its name to "FedEx Express" to distinguish its express shipping service from others offered by the FedEx parent company.

In 2001, FedEx Express signed a 7-year sole source contract to transport all Express Mail and Priority Mail for the United States Postal Service. Prior to 2001, the Postal Service contracted with multiple airlines on a regional basis for these services. This contract allowed FedEx to place drop boxes at every USPS post office. In 2007, the contract was extended until September 2013. In 2013, FedEx Express won a new 7-year contract for the services ending in 2020, beating out UPS which launched a competitive bid. In 2017, the Postal Service extended the 2013 contract to 2024. The USPS continues to be the largest customer of FedEx Express.

In December 2006, FedEx Express acquired the British courier company ANC Holdings Limited for £120 million. The acquisition added 35 sort facilities to the FedEx network and the company introduced Newark, Memphis, and Indianapolis routes directly to UK airports instead of stopping at FedEx's European hub at Charles de Gaulle Airport. In September 2007, ANC was rebranded as FedEx UK. FedEx Express also acquired Flying-Cargo Hungary Kft to expand service in Eastern Europe.

Economic downturn

The late-2000s recession hit parent company FedEx Corporation and its express division hard. Many companies looking for ways to save money stopped shipping or moved to cheaper alternatives, such as surface shipping. FedEx Corporation announced large network capacity reductions at FedEx Express, including retiring some of its oldest and least efficient aircraft such as the McDonnell Douglas DC-10 and the Airbus A310. FedEx also announced layoffs and work hour reductions at some of its hubs.

In December 2008, FedEx postponed delivery of the new Boeing 777 Freighter; four were delivered in 2010 as previously agreed, but in 2011, FedEx only took delivery of four, rather than the ten originally planned. The remaining aircraft were delivered in 2012 and 2013.

FedEx Express closed a hub for the first time in its history, when operations at its Asian-Pacific hub at Subic Bay International Airport in the Philippines ceased on February 6, 2009. The operations were transferred to Guangzhou Baiyun International Airport in southern China. FedEx Express had planned to open the new Chinese hub in December 2008, but in November 2008, the company delayed the opening until early 2009, citing the need to fully test the new hub.

On June 2, 2009, FedEx opened the new hub building at Piedmont Triad International Airport in Greensboro, North Carolina. FedEx announced in December 2008 that it still intended to open the building on time despite the bad economy. The hub's operations would be scaled back from 1,500 employees to only 160, the size of the previous operations at the much smaller sorting facility. FedEx gave no time line as to when the hub would be operating at expected hub levels. The hub had been delayed many years since FedEx first picked the airport to be its Mid-Atlantic U.S. hub back in 1998. FedEx had to fight many complaints from nearby homeowners about the anticipated noise generated by its aircraft, because most of its flights take place at night. A third runway was built to accommodate the hub operation and the extra aircraft.  FedEx began full hub operations at the Greensboro facility September 2, 2018.

On October 27, 2010, FedEx opened its Central and Eastern European hub at Cologne Bonn Airport. The hub features a fully automated sorting system that can process up to 18,000 packages per hour. The roof of the hub features FedEx's largest solar power installation, producing 800,000 kilowatt hours per year.

On December 7, 2018, the company announced the retirement of David Cunningham on December 31, 2018. He was succeeded as CEO and president by Raj Subramaniam.

Expansion
On November 6, 2019, FedEx Express announced its return to the Philippines, an Asia–Pacific hub. The company says it does not want to relocate Asia–Pacific hub to the Philippines, but they are planning to expand operations in Clark, Pampanga. On October 6, 2020, FedEx celebrates its 36 Years of Operations with new Philippines gateway in Clark. The company built and opened a 17,000 sq.m. facility (costing US$30 million) at Clark in July 2021.

Fleet

Current fleet
, the FedEx Express fleet consists of the following aircraft:

Note: "F" stands for freighter aircraft. "SF" stands for special freighter aircraft, which are converted from passenger aircraft.

FedEx Express operates the world's largest cargo air fleet with more than 650 aircraft, and is the largest operator of the Airbus A300, ATR 42, Cessna 208, DC-10/MD-10, and the MD-11. The company took delivery of the last Boeing 727 built in September 1984 and the last A300/A310 built in July 2007. To be able to respond to changing freight demand quickly (i.e. more cargo that can fit on an aircraft), or to prevent cargo from being stranded on aircraft grounded with mechanical problems, FedEx Express tends to keep a number of empty or underloaded aircraft (usually five) in the air during the overnight to "sweep" the US.

In 2007, FedEx revealed plans to acquire 90 Boeing 757-200SFs. Because production ended in 2005, FedEx was left with no choice but to acquire secondhand aircraft from other airlines to replace its aging Boeing 727 fleet, at a cost of US$2.6 billion. The 757's debut for revenue service was on May 28, 2008. The last Boeing 727 was retired on June 21, 2013, after 35 years of service with FedEx.

FedEx Express was scheduled to be the launch airline for the Airbus A380 freighter, having ordered ten for delivery between 2008 and 2011 with options on ten more. The company had planned to introduce the first aircraft into service in August 2008 for use on routes between hubs in the United States and Asia. Faced with A380 delays of more than two years, FedEx canceled these orders and replaced them with an order for 15 Boeing 777Fs with an option for 15 more, to be delivered from 2009 through 2011. FedEx has said that Airbus will allow it to transfer its nonrefundable deposits to purchases of future aircraft, and has stated it may consider the A380F when the A380 program is less affected by construction delays. In December 2008, FedEx postponed delivery of some of the 777s: four were to be delivered in 2010 as previously agreed, and four more in 2011, rather than the 10 originally planned. Delivery of the remaining aircraft was postponed to 2012 and 2013. In January 2009, FedEx exercised its options to buy 15 more 777 freighters and acquired options for a further 15.

On December 15, 2011, FedEx announced an order for 27 Boeing 767-300Fs to replace its MD-10s. The 767s will be delivered between 2014 and 2018, with three aircraft being delivered in 2014, and with six aircraft delivered each year between 2015 and 2018. The airline also delayed deliveries of eleven Boeing 777Fs currently on order, but converted two options to firm orders.

On July 2, 2012, FedEx announced an order for an additional 15 Boeing 767-300Fs to replace its MD-10 and A310-200 aircraft. As part of this announcement, it converted four of its Boeing 777 freighter order to 767-300Fs, for a total of 19 new 767s. The first Boeing 767-300F was delivered to the airline on September 4, 2013.

With one of the world's largest aircraft fleets, FedEx Express is the largest contributor to the United States Civil Reserve Air Fleet in terms of aircraft pledged.

The first Dassault Falcon 20C delivered to FedEx (operated with the registration N8FE) is on display at the Steven F. Udvar-Hazy Center of the National Air and Space Museum at the Smithsonian Institution.

Historical fleet

FedEx Feeder

FedEx Feeder is the branding applied to all FedEx Express propeller-driven aircraft that feed packages to and from airports served by larger jet aircraft.

In the United States (along with Morningstar Air Express in Canada), FedEx Express operates FedEx Feeder (and for Morningstar, mainline FedEx service) on a dry lease program where the contractor will lease the aircraft from the FedEx fleet and provide a crew to operate the aircraft solely for FedEx. All of the feeder aircraft operated in the United States, plus the Morningstar feeder and mainline fleet, are owned by FedEx and because of this all of the aircraft are in the FedEx Feeder livery (or in the case of Morningstar's mainline fleet, standard FedEx Express livery). Just like regional airlines, the contractor operates the aircraft with its own flight number and call sign.

Outside the United States (except for Morningstar Air Express), the contractor will supply its own aircraft, which may or may not be in the FedEx Feeder livery. Depending on the arrangement with FedEx, the contractor may be able to carry cargo for other companies with the FedEx cargo.

List of contract carriers:

 ASL Airlines Ireland (Largest contractor, European partner)
Airwork 
 Baron Aviation Services
 Cargojet Airways
 Carson Air (regional routes in Western Canada)
 Corporate Air
 CSA Air
 Empire Airlines
 IFL Group
 Merlin Airways
 Morningstar Air Express – Also operates mainline FedEx service within Canada
 Mountain Air Cargo
 Solinair
 Swiftair
 West Air Inc.
 Wiggins Airways

Environmental initiatives

Delivery fleet

In 2003, FedEx Express introduced hybrid electric/diesel trucks into its fleet. At the time, the company had hoped to replace its entire 30,000 W700 delivery truck fleet with the hybrid, but in June 2009, only 170 were on the road. 93 of these operated in the United States in New York, Tampa, Sacramento, and Washington, D.C.; while the rest operated in Tokyo, Toronto, and Turin. FedEx blamed the low number on a lack of investment from other major companies in hybrid technology. It had hoped that other companies would order hybrid trucks, and that tax credits would be issued by the United States government to reduce the cost.

FedEx claimed that the hybrid truck in the 2003 test decreased soot by 96% and emissions by 65%. It also claimed that the truck achieved more than 50% better fuel consumption while still having the same cargo capacity as a conventional truck.

In 2009, FedEx Express partnered with Iveco and started a new test program of hybrid electric/diesel vans. The test program consisted of ten hybrid vans deployed in the Italian cities of Milan and Turin. FedEx claimed the new vans would have a 26.5% reduction in fuel consumption and a decrease in carbon dioxide emissions of 7.5 tons when compared to FedEx's standard vehicle. The trial was set to conclude in May 2010 and FedEx would then evaluate if the vans should be deployed on a larger scale.

In July 2009, FedEx Express partnered with Freightliner and Eaton Corporation to convert 92 delivery trucks into hybrids. The conversions boosted FedEx's fleet of hybrid-electric vehicles by more than 50 percent to 264. The trucks were placed into service in California, in Los Angeles, San Diego and San Francisco.

In November 2009, FedEx Express purchased 51 gasoline-electric hybrid vehicles from Azure Dynamics, to be put into service in The Bronx, New York City. The Bronx became FedEx's first all hybrid station. The addition would bring FedEx Express’ fleet of hybrid electric and electric vehicles to 325.

Aircraft modernization

FedEx Express has set a goal of getting 30 percent of its jet fuel from petroleum alternatives by 2030.

FedEx phased out its last Boeing 727s in 2013 replacing them with Boeing 757s; the airline says the 757s are 47 percent more fuel-efficient. FedEx will eventually switch from MD-11s to Boeing 777s for its long-range, international routes, freeing up the MD-11 fleet to fly shorter routes currently flown by the DC-10.

Major incidents and accidents
Over the history of Federal Express and FedEx Express, there have been eight incidents in its mainline fleet, plus an attempted hijacking, two deaths and eight aircraft hull losses. This table only lists mainline fleet crashes that happened under FedEx Express' direct operations, and does not list either crashes related to the FedEx Feeder fleet, or incidents or accidents associated with the Flying Tiger Line after its acquisition by Federal Express until its operations were fully merged with Federal Express.

Northrop Grumman Guardian

In 2003 FedEx Express partnered with the Department of Homeland Security and Northrop Grumman to develop and flight test an anti-missile system, the Northrop Grumman Guardian. It is intended that this system could be deployed on commercial airliners to protect them from terrorist attacks such as the attempted shootdown of a DHL Airbus A300 in 2003. FedEx supplied an MD-11 and a leased 747 for the flight test phase.

FedEx Express became the first air carrier to deploy the Guardian on a commercial flight in September 2006, when it equipped an MD-10 freighter with the pod. By December 2007, the company had nine aircraft equipped with the system for further testing and evaluation. Because of the program's success, the U.S. Congress directed DHS to extend it to passenger-carrying aircraft.

Sorting facilities

Americas
 
 Campinas - Brazilian Hub
 
 Toronto–Pearson - Canadian Hub
 
 Anchorage
 Fort Worth, TX - Southwest Hub
 Greensboro, NC - Mid-Atlantic Hub
 Indianapolis - National Hub
 Miami - Latin America Hub 
 Memphis - World Super Hub
 Newark - East Coast Hub
 Oakland, CA - West Coast Hub

Asia
 
 Guangzhou - Asia-Pacific Hub
 Shanghai–Pudong - Mainland China Hub
 
 Osaka–Kansai - North Pacific Regional Hub
 Tokyo–Narita
 
 Singapore - South Pacific Regional Hub
 
 Seoul–Incheon
 
 Taipei–Taoyuan
 
 Dubai–International - Middle East Hub

Europe
 
 Paris–CDG - European Hub
 
 Cologne/Bonn
 
 London–Stansted

See also

 Air transportation in the United States
 Aviation
 DHL Aviation
 FedEx Corporation
 List of airlines of the United States
 List of airports in the United States
 TNT Airways
 Transportation in the United States
 UPS Airlines
 USPS

References

External links

 FedEx
 FedEx History
 FedEx Express Site

 
Airlines based in Tennessee
Airlines for America members
Regional Airline Association members
Companies based in Memphis, Tennessee
FedEx
Airlines established in 1971
Cargo airlines of the United States
American companies established in 1971
1971 establishments in Arkansas
Cargo airlines